Muhammad Mian Mansoor Ansari (1884 – 11 January 1946), (10 March 1884 – 11 January 1946) was a leader and a political activist of the Indian independence movement. He was a grandson of Muhammad Qasim Nanautavi, one of the founders of Darul Uloom Deoband in 1868. Along with Mahmud Hasan Deobandi, he was one of the pioneer of the Silk Letter movement against British Raj.

Early life 
Muhammad Mian Mansoor Ansari was born into an Ansari family in Saharanpur. He grew up in the house of Abdullah Ansari. Mansoor Ansari returned to the Darul-Uloom Deoband and gradually became involved in the Pan-Islamic movement. During World War I, he was among the leaders of the Deoband School, who, led by Mahmud Hasan Deobandi, left India to seek support of the Central Powers for a Pan-Islamic revolution in India in what came to be known as the Silk Letter Movement.

Silk letter movement
These letters were written on silk cloth, hence the name. The hero of Silk Letter Movement, Maulana Muhammad Mian Mansoor Ansari, the one who went to Hejaz, Ottoman Empire with Maulana Mahmud al-Hasan in September 1915 and worked as treasurer of the Jama’at. He returned to India in April 1916 with Ghalib Nama (Silk Letter) which he showed to freedom fighters in India and the autonomous area and then took it to Kabul, Afghanistan in June 1916.

Later years 
Mansoor Ansari went to Kabul during the First world war to rally the Afghan Amir Habibullah Khan. He joined the Provisional Government of India formed in Kabul in December 1915, and remained in Afghanistan until the end of the war. He traveled to Russia and spent two years in Turkey, passing through many other countries.

He was one of the most active and prominent members of the faction of the Indian Freedom Movement led by Muslim clergy who were chiefly from the Darul Uloom Deoband. 

In 1946, the Indian National Congress requested him to return to India and the British Government gave him the permission to do so. But he decided to remain at Kabul, where he began a programme teaching and translating Tafsir Sheikh Mahmudul Hassan Deobandi (known as Kabuli Tafseer).

Literary works
Ansāri wrote following books:
 Hukūmat-e-Ilāhi;;
 Asās-Inqelāb 
 Dastoor-e-Imāmat

Death and legacy
In 1946, Muhammad Mian Mansoor Ansari turned seriously ill and subsequently died on 11 January 1946 at Jalalabad, Nangarhar Province in Afghanistan and was buried there. His son Hamid al-Ansari Ghazi was the editor of Madina.

References

1884 births
1946 deaths
People from Saharanpur
Indian independence activists from Uttar Pradesh
20th-century Muslim scholars of Islam
Hindu–German Conspiracy
Deobandis
20th-century Indian Muslims
Sunni Muslim scholars of Islam
Students of Mahmud Hasan Deobandi